The July 1 Medal is a decoration of the People's Republic of China awarded by the General Secretary of the Chinese Communist Party, party leader and state paramount leader. It is the highest award given to the Chinese Communist Party (CCP) members, constituted on July 22, 2017.

The July 1 Medal set up by the Communist Party shall be bestowed on party members who have made outstanding contributions to the Socialism with Chinese characteristics.

History 
On February 27, 2021, the General Office of the Chinese Communist Party issued a notice 'Doing a Good Job in the Nomination of the July 1 Medal' and the 'National Two Priorities and One First Recommendations'. This is the first time in the name of the Central Committee of the Chinese Communist Party on the 100th anniversary of the founding of the Chinese Communist Party.

The awarding of July 1 Medal is to commend national outstanding Communist Party members, national outstanding party workers and national advanced grassroots party organizations. On May 31, 2021, the Organization Department of the Chinese Communist Party, CCP Central Committee Organization Department, the Office of the Party and the State Merit published a list to nominate candidates for the award.

On June 29, the award ceremony was held at 10:29 on June morning in the Great Hall of the People. At the ceremony, Wang Huning, the First Secretary of the Central Secretariat of the Chinese Communist Party, read the 'Decision of the Central Committee of the Communist Party of China on Awarding the July 1 Medal'. General Secretary of the Chinese Communist Party Xi Jinping awarded 29 individuals the July 1 Medal at the ceremony.

Eligibility 
In July 2017, the 'Regulations on the Inner-Party Meritorious Recognition of the Communist Party of China' and 'Measures for the Award of the July 1 Medal' was formulated by the Party and National Meritorious Commendation Working Committee. It was approved and implemented by the CCP Central Committee. In accordance with to it, the July 1 Medal is awarded to party members who have made outstanding contributions to the great cause of Socialism with Chinese characteristics and the great new project of party building.

Recipients

References 

2017 establishments in China
Awards established in 2017
Orders, decorations, and medals of the People's Republic of China